Tenden is a surname. Notable people with the surname include:

 Asbjørn Tenden (born 1975), Norwegian footballer
 Borghild Tenden (born 1951), Norwegian politician
 Steinar Tenden (born 1978), Norwegian footballer, brother of Asbjørn